Ryzhkovo is a rural locality (a village) in Korotovskoye Rural Settlement, Cherepovetsky District, Vologda Oblast, Russia. The population was 9 as of 2002.

Geography 
Pesye is the nearest rural locality.

References 

Rural localities in Cherepovetsky District